William Archer (né Eyre) (4 June 1677 – 30 June 1739), of Coopersale, in Theydon Garnon, Essex, and Welford Park, Berkshire, was an English lawyer and Tory  politician who sat in the House of Commons from 1734 to 1739.

Early life
Archer was born William Eyre on 4 June 1677. He was the second, but first surviving, son of William Eyre of Holme Hall and Highlow Hall, Derbyshire, and Catherine Gell, daughter of politician Sir John Gell, 2nd Baronet. As his uncle Sir Philip Gell, 3rd Baronet died in 1719 without any children, the Gell family estate passed to William's brother, John Eyre, who assumed the surname Gell. After his brother's death in 1739, the lands of Hopton Hall were inherited by John's eldest son, and Archer's nephew, Philip Eyre Gell, who was High Sheriff of Derbyshire.

Career
He entered Gray's Inn in 1696 and was called to the bar in 1705. He became a bencher in 1724.

He was returned unopposed a few months later at the 1734 British general election. He voted against the address on the Spanish Convention of 1739. Archer died in office in 1739.

Personal life
Archer was extremely wealthy. In addition to his own family's wealth, in 1706, he inherited the estates of Sir John Archer at Coopersale, Essex and Welford Park, Berkshire, on condition that he marry Archer's niece, Eleanor Wrottesley, daughter of Sir Walter Wrottesley, 3rd Baronet and assume the name Archer. They married, but had no children before Eleanora died on 2 May 1717.

After his first wife's death, he married, as his second wife, Susanna Newton, the only daughter of Sir John Newton, 3rd Baronet, of Barrs Court. Through this marriage, his second son inherited further estates from Susanna's brother, Sir Michael Newton, 4th Baronet, who died childless in 1743. Together they were the parents of:

 John Archer (–1800), who married Lady Mary Fitzwilliam, a daughter of John Fitzwilliam, 2nd Earl Fitzwilliam. Her sister was Lady Anne Fitzwilliam (the second wife of Francis Godolphin, 2nd Baron Godolphin) and her brother was William Fitzwilliam, 3rd Earl Fitzwilliam (who married Lady Anne, a daughter of the 1st Marquess of Rockingham).
 Michael Archer (–1803), an MP for Beverley who married Anne Bagshawe, the only daughter of Samuel Bagshawe of Ford Hall and Catharine (née Caldwell) Bagshawe (a daughter of Sir John Caldwell of Castle Caldwell), in 1799; he took name of Newton in 1743 to succeed to his uncle's estates.
 Catherine Archer (–1810), who married Philip Blundell.
 Susanna Archer (–1804), who married Edward Harley, 4th Earl of Oxford and Earl Mortimer in 1751; at the time of her marriage, her inheritance was worth £50,000. She succeeded to the estates of her brother Michael in 1803.

Archer died on 30 June 1739, aged 59. His widow died 28 January 1761.

Descendants
Through his eldest son John, his only child to have issue, he was a grandfather of two: Susannah (née Archer) Houblon (who, in 1770, married the merchant Jacob Houblon of Hallingbury Place, a son of Jacob Houblon, MP, and grandson of Sir John Hynde Cotton, 3rd Baronet, MP and Treasurer of the Chamber) and Charlotte (née Archer) Piggott (wife of Gillery Pigott, a first cousin once removed of the Hon. Sir Gillery Pigott).

References
Notes

Sources

External links
ARCHER, William (1677-1739), of Coopersale, in Theydon Garnon, Essex, and Welford, Berks. at History of Parliament Online

1677 births
1739 deaths
Members of Gray's Inn
Members of the Parliament of Great Britain for Berkshire
British MPs 1734–1741
Eyre family
People from Bakewell